Stella de’ Tolomei (died 1419), was an Italian courtier and royal mistress. She was the official royal mistress of Niccolò III d'Este, Marquis of Ferrara for many years and the mother of several of his acknowledged illegitimate children.

Issue
Ugo d'Este (1405–1425). Executed by his father on 21 May 1425 for allegedly having an affair with his stepmother Parisina Malatesta
Leonello d'Este (1407–1450). 
Borso d'Este (1413–1471).

References
 Giuliana Berengan (Herausgeberin). „Le Dame della Corte Estense – Ferrara delle Donne – Itinerari al femminile“. Editore Atelier IL PASSAGGIO, Ferrara 1998.

1419 deaths
Italian ladies-in-waiting
Mistresses of Italian royalty
15th-century Italian women